Jordaniidae is a small family of marine ray-finned fishes belonging to the order Scorpaeniformes. These fishes are found in the eastern North Pacific Ocean.

Taxonomy
Jordaniidae was first proposed as a subfamily, Jordaniinae, of the family Cottidae in 1898 by the American ichthyologists David Starr Jordan and Barton Warren Evermann. The 5th edition of Fishes of the World classifies this family within the superfamily Cottoidea, in the suborder Cottoidei of the Scorpaeniformes. Other authorities classify this family within the infraorder Cottales within the order Perciformes, as they suggest that Perciformes is paraphyletic if the Scorpaneiformes are excluded from it. The cabezon (Scorpaenichthys marmoratus) is classified within the Jordaniidae by some authorities but the 5th edition of Fishes of the World classifies this species in the monotypic family Scorpaenichthyidae. This family is regarded as one of the more basal members of the Cottoidea grouping.

Etymology
Jordaniidae takes its name from its type genus, Jordania, which was named by Edwin Chapin Starks in 1895 and Stark's' name honours David Starr Jordan who was his "teacher in ichthyology".

Genera and species
Jordaniidae contains two monotypic genera:
 Genus Jordania Starks, 1895
 Jordania zonope Starks, 1895 (Longfin sculpin)
 Genus Paricelinus C. H. Eigenmann & R. S. Eigenmann, 1889 
 Paricelinus hopliticus C.H. Eigenmann  R.S. Eigenmann, 1889 (Thornback sculpin)

Characteristics
Jordaniidae sculpins have a single pharyngobranchial on the gill arch, 5 finrays in the pelvic fin a long body with a long based anal fin 2 separtae dorsal fins and reduced gills.

Distribution and habitat
Jordaniidae sculpins are found in the eastern Pacific Ocean from Alaska to California.

References

Cottoidea
Taxa named by David Starr Jordan
Taxa named by Barton Warren Evermann
Ray-finned fish families